Guillermo Andrés Méndez Aguilera (born 26 August 1994 in Paysandú, Uruguay) is a Uruguayan footballer who plays for Unión Santa Fe.

References

1994 births
Living people
Uruguayan footballers
Uruguayan expatriate footballers
Uruguay youth international footballers
Association football midfielders
Standard Liège players
Sint-Truidense V.V. players
AD Alcorcón footballers
C.A. Bella Vista players
Unión de Santa Fe footballers
Challenger Pro League players
Segunda División players
Argentine Primera División players
Expatriate footballers in Argentina
Expatriate footballers in Belgium
Expatriate footballers in Spain
Uruguayan expatriate sportspeople in Argentina
Uruguayan expatriate sportspeople in Belgium
Uruguayan expatriate sportspeople in Spain
Footballers from Paysandú